State Route 116 (SR 116) is part of Maine's system of numbered state highways, located in Penobscot County.

Route description
SR 116 begins at SR 16 at Old Town. It heads east towards the Penobscot River, running parallel with it to the junction with State Routes 6 and 155 in Howland. SR 116 then meets U.S. Route 2 in Enfield. SR 116 and SR 6 follows U.S. Route 2 to Lincoln, Maine while SR 155 continues east from Enfield. SR 116 splits off U.S. Route 2 and SR 6 just south of Lincoln. The route heads northwest, crossing the Penobscot River again. The route then turns right from the Mattamiscontis Road intersection to the town of Chester. After passing Chester, the route keeps heading north towards Interstate 95 without an interchange and goes to the town of Medway, where the route ends at State Routes 11 and 157.

Major junctions

References

External links

Maine State Route log via floodgap.com

116
Transportation in Penobscot County, Maine